The Fly Hard Trikes SkyCycle is an American ultralight trike, designed by Mike Theeke and produced by Fly Hard Trikes of Wildwood, Georgia. The aircraft is supplied as a complete ready-to-fly-aircraft and several hundred have been completed and flown.

Design and development
It features a cable-braced or optionally a strut-braced hang glider-style high-wing, weight-shift controls, a single-seat open cockpit with a small cockpit fairing, tricycle landing gear and a single engine in pusher configuration.

The aircraft is made from bolted-together aluminum tubing, with its single surface wing covered in Dacron sailcloth. Its  span wing uses an "A" frame weight-shift control bar. The powerplant is a twin cylinder, air-cooled, two-stroke, single-ignition  Rotax 447 engine or the twin-cylinder, in-line, two-stroke  Kawasaki 340.

A number of different wings can be fitted to the basic carriage, including the strut-braced North Wing Maverick III and the Airborne Sting 175.

An electric-powered version was reportedly under development in 2011.

Operational history
The aircraft has won many awards including, 2007 Sun 'n Fun Best Type Trike Ultralight, 2008 Sun 'n Fun Outstanding Weight Shift Ultralight, 2009 Sun 'n Fun Grand Champion and Best Commercial Ultralight, 2010 Sun 'n Fun Best Type Trike Ultralight and Best Commercial Ultralight, 2011 Sun 'n Fun Best Type Trike Ultralight and 2012 Sun 'n Fun Grand Champion.

Variants
SkyCycle S
SkyCycle Firefly

Specifications (SkyCycle S)

See also

References

External links

2000s United States sport aircraft
2000s United States ultralight aircraft
Single-engined pusher aircraft
Ultralight trikes